In Sikhism, some Sikhs particularly of the Nihang community use edible cannabis in a religious context. They make use of cannabis by ingestion. It is used to make a drink called "Shaheedi Degha" which is meant to help Nihang Singhs become highly present in the moment. Nihang Singhs used marijuana in the early times of Sikh history during times of battle, it is believed to help them become more fierce warriors. I’m

Prohibition

The first Sikh guru, Guru Nanak, stated that using any mind altering substance (without medical purposes) is a distraction from God. Guru Nanak was offered bhang by the Mughal emperor Babur; Nanak however declined, and recited this shabad:

The SGPC has also added a section in their rehait maryada (Sikh codes of conduct) that bans the Cannabis, opium and liquor for all Sikhs that follow its rehit maryada. The following is a translated quote from the rehait maryada. "A Sikh must not take hemp (cannabis), opium, liquor, tobacco, in short, any intoxicant. His only routine intake should be food."

Usage

The Sikhs inherited the tradition of drinking originates from the sixth Sikh Guru, Sri Guru Hargobind Sahib ji who started it to give sikhs Bir Ras (warrior spirit) and to get them energized, as sikhs used to get up at around 12 am for armit vela and not go back to sleep till after the evening prayers of Sohila Sahib.

Nihang Sikhs
In the modern day, cannabis consumption (but not smoking) is commonly associated with the Nihang Singhs, a sect who continue the orthodox Sikh warrior tradition, who consume drinks as sukha or sukhnidhaan, or more commonly known shaheedi degha. shaheedi degh is mostly used in Panjab on the Sikh holidays of Holla Mohalla and Vaisakhi. At many Sikh temples, including Takht Sachkhand Sri Hazur Sahib Ji, the shaheedi degh is offered as a holy food.

In 2001, Baba Santa Singh, the jathedar of Budha Dal, along with 20 Nihang jathadars (leaders), refused to accept the ban on the consumption of bhang by the SGPC. Baba Santa Singh was excommunicated for a different issue, and replaced with Balbir Singh (who isn't accepted to be a nihang leader by most nihang singhs), who agreed to shun the consumption of bhang.

Some Nihang groups consume cannabis or shaheedi degh (ਭੰਗ), purportedly to help in meditation. Sukhaa-parsaad (ਸੁੱਖਾਪ੍ਰਰਸਾਦ), "dry-sweet", is the term Nihang use to refer to it. It was traditionally crushed and taken as a liquid, especially during festivals like Hola Mohalla.

See also 

 Rehat
 Diet in Sikhism
 Jhatka
 Meat consumption among Sikhs
 Prohibitions in Sikhism
 Bhangi Misl

References

Cannabis and Sikhism
Cannabis culture
Cannabis in India